Dream Scene is an album by the progressive bluegrass Maryland band The Seldom Scene. There were several personnel changes in the group after the unsuccessful comeback with John Starling. Mike Auldridge, Moondi Klein, and T. Michael Coleman left the group to form progressive band Chesapeake. Duffey and Eldridge recruited guitarist/singer Dudley Connell, dobroist Fred Travers and bass player Ronnie Simpkins to continue with the group. This album would be the last for John Duffey who died late in 1996.

Track listing
 Dry Run Creek (McPeak) 2:34
 Going up on the Mountain (Gamble, Huff) 3:17
 Willie Roy (Williams) 4:40
 Tulsa Chili Bop (Pennington) 3:09
 When I Get My Rewards (Kennerley) 3:40
 They're at Rest Together (Traditional) 2:59
 The Boatman (Hylton) 3:33
 Love of the Mountains (Mills) 2:46
 Little Sparrow (Fair Tender Ladies) (Traditional) 5:21
 The Shape I'm In (Connell) 3:45
 Blue Diamond (Ritchie) 5:15
 Bad Moon Rising (Fogerty) 2:21

Personnel
 Dudley Connell - vocals, guitar, mandolin
 John Duffey - mandolin, vocals
 Ben Eldridge - banjo, guitar, vocals
 Fred Travers - Dobro, guitar, vocals
 Ronnie Simpkins - bass, vocals

References

External links
Official site

1996 albums
The Seldom Scene albums
Sugar Hill Records albums